Fred Higgins is an English former professional rugby league footballer who played in the 1940s and 1950s. He also appeared for Wigan as a World War II guest player.

Playing career

International honours
Fred Higgins won caps for England while at Widnes in 1945 against Wales, in 1949 against France, in 1950 against Wales (2 matches), and won caps for Great Britain while at Widnes in 1950 against Australia (3 matches), and New Zealand (2 matches), and in 1951 against New Zealand.

County Cup Final appearances
Fred Higgins played right-, i.e. number 12, in Widnes' 7-3 victory over Wigan in the 1945 Lancashire County Cup Final during the 1945–46 season at Wilderspool Stadium, Warrington on Saturday 27 October 1945.

Honoured at Widnes
Fred Higgins is a Widnes Hall Of Fame Inductee.

Genealogical information
Fred Higgins is the younger brother of the rugby league footballers Jack Higgins, and Alec Higgins.

References

External links
Statistics at rugby.widnes.tv
Hall Of Fame at rugby.widnes.tv
Statistics at wigan.rlfans.com

1920 births
1995 deaths
England national rugby league team players
English rugby league players
Great Britain national rugby league team players
Place of birth missing
Rugby league players from Widnes
Rugby league second-rows
Widnes Vikings players
Wigan Warriors wartime guest players